Gibberifera is a genus of moths belonging to the subfamily Olethreutinae of the family Tortricidae.

Species
Gibberifera alba Kawabe & Nasu, 1994
Gibberifera angkhangensis Kawabe & Nasu, 1994
Gibberifera clavata Zhang & Li, 2004
Gibberifera glaciata Meyrick, 1907
Gibberifera hepaticana Kawabe & Nasu, 1994
Gibberifera mienshana Kuznetzov, 1971
Gibberifera monticola Kuznetzov, 1971
Gibberifera nigrovena Kawabe & Nasu, 1994
Gibberifera obscura Diakonoff, 1964
Gibberifera qingchengensis Nasu & Liu, 1996
Gibberifera similis Kuznetzov, 1971
Gibberifera simplana Fischer von Rslerstamm, 1836
Gibberifera yadongensis Nasu & Liu, 1996

See also
List of Tortricidae genera

References

External links
tortricidae.com

Eucosmini
Tortricidae genera